Kilsəli or Kilisali or Kiliselli or Kil’syali may refer to:
Kilsəli, Gadabay, Azerbaijan
Kilsəli, Kalbajar, Azerbaijan